The Ulster Senior League is an association football league featuring amateur, intermediate, and League of Ireland reserve teams. Together with the Leinster Senior League Senior Division and the Munster Senior League Senior Premier Division, it forms the third level of the Republic of Ireland football league system. Ulster Senior League teams also compete in the FAI Cup and the FAI Intermediate Cup. The winners of the Ulster Senior League have also been invited to play in the League of Ireland Cup. Despite using the Ulster name in its title, almost all of its clubs are based in County Donegal and the City of Derry. The most successful club in the league has been Fanad United who have won fourteen league titles and ten league cups. Since 2006 the USL has operated as a summer league with the season typically operating from April to October.

History
The Ulster Senior League was formed in 1986. The driving force behind the establishment of the league was Fr. Michael Sweeney, a pioneer of junior and intermediate association football in County Donegal. In addition to founding the USL, Sweeney had earlier been instrumental in both establishing the Donegal League and forming Fanad United. Fanad United were the inaugural USL champions in 1986–87 and they subsequently went on to become the league's most successful club, winning fourteen league titles and ten league cups. In more recent seasons, Cockhill Celtic have challenged Fanad United's dominance, winning their first title in 2010 and then nine consecutive titles between 2013 and 2022. The winners of the Ulster Senior League have regularly been invited to participate in the League of Ireland Cup. In 1987–88 Fanad United were semi-finalists. Cockhill Celtic, Culdaff and Swilly Rovers have all represented the USL in the League of Ireland Cup. Fanad United have also won the FAI Intermediate Cup twice while Letterkenny Rovers were finalists in 2015–16.

September 2020 saw the leagues most successful club, Fanad United, announce their withdrawal from the USL to join the Donegal Junior League

2021 saw Monaghan United F.C., a former League of Ireland club, join the Ulster Senior League, the first club from Counties Cavan or Monaghan to do so.

2022-23 teams

Champions

List of winners by season

List of winners by club

Ulster Senior League Cup
The Ulster Senior League Cup has had four different sponsors since first being played for in 1986–87. Initially, the competition was sponsored by the Hotel Glenveagh in Gweedore before being sponsored by Hydro Seafoods and then Marine Harvest. It is now known as the Donegal News Ulster Senior League Cup.

Finals

Notes

Representative team
An Ulster Senior League representative team competes in the FAI Intermediate Interprovincial Tournament against teams representing the Leinster Senior League, the Munster Senior League and Connacht.

Notable former players
Republic of Ireland internationals
  Shay Given
Northern Ireland U21 international
  Michael Duffy
League of Ireland First Division Top Scorer
  Kevin McHugh
League of Ireland manager
  Paul Hegarty

References

 
3
1
Ire
1
Summer association football leagues
1986 establishments in Ireland
Sports leagues established in 1986
Professional sports leagues in Ireland